Cinder is the seventh major album by Australian trio, Dirty Three. Conceived in the summer of 2005 on Phillip Island, in South Eastern Australia, the songs are shorter, more trimmed down and classic in composition than usual Dirty Three output.

Recorded in just 10 days, Cinder's 19 tracks includes violin, drums, mandolin, bouzouki, organ, piano, acoustic guitar, bagpipes, and, rarely for a Dirty Three album, vocals.

Chan Marshall also lends her talents to the album with some vocals, as well as co-writing one of the songs.

Cover art by guitarist Mick Turner.

Track listing
All tracks by Dirty Three except where noted.

 "Ever Since" – 4:48
 "She Passed Through" – 3:26
 "Amy" – 2:48
 "Sad Jexy" – 3:23
 "Cinders" – 3:02
 "Doris" – 3:26
 "Flutter" – 6:36
 "The Zither Player" (Félix Lajkó)– 5:01
 "It Happened" – 2:14
 "Great Waves" – 3:28 (vocals by Chan Marshall)
 "Dream Evie" – 2:43
 "Too Soon, Too Late" – 3:29
 "This Night" – 3:56
 "Rain On" – 3:39
 "Ember" – 2:38
 "Michèle" – 3:23
 "Feral" – 4:10 (vocals by Sally Timms of The Mekons)
 "Last Dance" – 4:16
 "In Fall" – 3:54

Japanese bonus tracks
<li> "June's A Calling" – 1:50
<li> "Lisa's Mountain" – 2:57

Personnel 
Warren Ellis – mandolin, piano, violin, viola, bouzouki
Chan Marshall – vocals
Casey Rice – engineer, mixing
Mark Saul – bagpipes
Sally Timms – vocals
Mick Turner – organ, bass, guitar, cover art
Jim White – drums

References

2005 albums
Dirty Three albums
Touch and Go Records albums